Agonopterix squamosa is a moth of the family Depressariidae. It is found in Spain, France,  Italy, Croatia, North Macedonia and Turkey and on Sardinia and Sicily. It has also been recorded from Israel.

References

External links
lepiforum.de

Moths described in 1864
Agonopterix
Moths of Europe
Moths of Asia